Giuseppe Francesco Bianchi (1752 – 27 November 1810) was an Italian opera composer. Born in Cremona, Lombardy, he studied with Pasquale Cafaro and Niccolò Jommelli, and worked mainly in London, Paris and in all the major Italian operatic centers of Venice, Naples, Rome, Milan, Turin, Florence.

He wrote at least 78 operas of all genres, mainly in the field of the Italian opera, but in the French opera too. These included the drammi per musica (opera seria) Castore e Polluce (Florence 1779), Arbace and Zemira (both Naples, 1781), Alonso e Cora (Venice, 1786), Calto and La morte di Cesare (both Venice, 1788), and Seleuco, re di Siria (Venice, 1791), and the opera giocosa La villanella rapita (Süttör, 1784).

Bianchi committed suicide in Hammersmith, London, in 1810, probably out of family troubles. He was buried alongside his daughter in the churchyard of the old Kensington Church, now St Mary Abbots, Kensington.

His widow published parts of his "theoretical work" in the Quarterly Music Review for 1820/1821.

Private life
Bianchi married Jane Jackson who was a well known singer. She had a continuing career after Bianchi's death, married William Lacy and they performed for seven years at the court of Oudh.

Works

Operas 
See: List of operas by Francesco Bianchi

Religious compositions 

 Domine ad adiuvandum, 2 August 1773, Cremona
 Converte Domine, 10 May 1779, Milan, Metropolitan Cathedral
 Exalta Domine, 10 May 1779, Milan, Metropolitan Cathedral
 Deus noster refugium con Gloria patri, 10 May 1779, Milan, Metropolitan Cathedral
 Abraham et Isaac; Tres pueri hebrai; others

References
Notes

Sources
"Bianchi, Francesco" by Marita P. McClymonds and Sven Hansell in Grove Music Online. Oxford Music Online, accessed 5 January 2010 
  Caruselli, Salvatore (ed.), Grande enciclopedia della musica lirica, Longanesi &C. Periodici S.p.A., Roma, vol. 4
 Highfill, Jr., Philip H., Burnim, Kalman A., and Langhans, Edward A., A Biographical Dictionary of Actors, Actresses, Musicians, Dancers, Managers and Other Stage Personnel in London, 1660–1800: v. 2, Southern Illinois University Press, Carbondale, 1973, 
 Sadie, Stanley (ed), New Grove Dictionary of Opera, Oxford University Press, 1992, vol. 4

External links
 

1752 births
1810 deaths
Suicides in Hammersmith
Musicians from Cremona
Italian Classical-period composers
Italian opera composers
Male opera composers
Italian male classical composers
19th-century Italian male musicians
1810s suicides